Elia Bossi (born ) is an Italian male volleyball player. He is part of the Italy men's national volleyball team. On club level he plays for Modena Volley.

Sporting achievements

Clubs

National championships
 2015/2016  Italian Cup, with DHL Modena Volley

References

External links
 profile at FIVB.org

1994 births
Living people
Italian women's volleyball players
Italian men's volleyball players
Place of birth missing (living people)
Volleyball players at the 2015 European Games
European Games competitors for Italy
LGBT volleyball players